Soulife is the first compilation album by American singer Anthony Hamilton. It was released on June 20, 2005, by Atlantic and Rhino Records. His third album overall, the album is a collection of previously unreleased songs recorded by Hamilton. The song "Love and War", which features Macy Gray, appeared on the soundtrack to the 2001 film Baby Boy.

After leaving MCA Records, which released his debut album XTC in 1996, Hamilton found a home at Soulife Records, a small Los Angeles-based independent label, where he recorded tracks between 1999 and 2001 for what was supposed to be his second studio album. Soulife went bankrupt before it could release the material, leaving the album unreleased.

Soulife debuted at number 12 on the Billboard 200 and number four on the Top R&B/Hip-Hop Albums chart, selling 53,000 copies in its first week.

Track listing

Notes
  signifies an additional producer

Sample credits
 "Love Is So Complicated" contains elements and a sample of "Midnight Groove" by Love Unlimited Orchestra.

Charts

Weekly charts

Year-end charts

Release history

Notes

References

2005 compilation albums
Albums produced by Mike City
Albums recorded at Chung King Studios
Albums recorded at Westlake Recording Studios
Anthony Hamilton (musician) albums
Atlantic Records compilation albums
Rhino Records compilation albums